Polish Council may refer to:

 Polish Council of State, a collective head of state
 Polish Language Council, the official language regulating organ of the Polish language